Dontayvion Wicks (born ~2001) is an American football wide receiver for the Virginia Cavaliers.

High school career
Wicks attended Plaquemine High School in Plaquemine, Louisiana. He played wide receiver and quarterback in high school. He committed to the University of Virginia to play college football.

College career
As a true freshman at Virginia in 2019, Wicks played in 10 games and had three receptions for 61 yards and a touchdown. He missed the 2020 season due to an injury suffered before the season. In 2021, Wicks started 11 of 12 games, recording 57 receptions for a school-record 1,203 yards and nine touchdowns.

References

External links
Virginia Cavaliers bio

Living people
People from Plaquemine, Louisiana
Players of American football from Louisiana
American football wide receivers
Virginia Cavaliers football players
Year of birth missing (living people)